

Advertising and public relations

Aerospace 

 Henry Crown (1896–1990), founder of the Material Service Corporation (merged with General Dynamics)
 Jesse Itzler (1968–), co-founder of Marquis Jet (now NetJets), a private jet card company, and co-owner of NBA's Atlanta Hawks
 Abraham Karem (1937–), Iraqi-born founder of Karem Aircraft, Inc., UAV (drone) technology pioneer
 Si Ramo (1913–2016), co-founder of TRW Inc.
 Bernard L. Schwartz (1925–), long-time CEO of Loral Space & Communications Inc.
 Al Schwimmer (1917–2011), American-Israeli founder of Israel Aerospace Industries Ltd. (IAI)

Cosmetics

Energy and mining 

 Guma Aguiar (1977–2015), Brazilian-born energy industrialist, co-founder of Leor Energy L.P.; disappeared in June 2012
 Arthur Belfer (1906–1993), Polish-born founder of the Belco Petroleum Company, one of the precursor companies of Enron Corporation
 Louis Blaustein (1869–1937), Lithuanian-born co-founder (along with his son Jacob) of the American Oil Company (1922)
 Jacob Blaustein (1892–1970), American-born co-founder (along with his father Louis) of the American Oil Company (1922)
 Marvin Davis (1925–2004), chairman of the Davis Petroleum Corp., briefly owner of 20th Century Fox and the Beverly Hills Hotel; member of the Davis family
 Max Fisher (1908–2005), founder of the Aurora Gasoline Company, once one of the largest gas station chains in the Midwest
 Robert Friedland (1950–), American-Canadian co-founder of Ivanhoe Energy Inc. and chairman of Ivanhoe Mines Ltd.
 Avram Glazer (1960–), former chairman and CEO of Zapata Corp. (now HRG Group, Inc.), co-chairman of family-owned EPL's Manchester United F.C.; member of the Glazer family
 Joseph S. Gruss (1903–1993), Ukrainian-born founder of Gruss & Company
 Jack J. Grynberg (1932–), Polish-born oil and natural gas developer, founder of Oceanic Exploration Co.
 Meyer Guggenheim (1828–1905), Swiss-born mining magnate; member of the Guggenheim family
 Armand Hammer (1898–1990), long-time CEO and president of the Occidental Petroleum Corporation, co-founder of Isramco
 Leon Hess (1914–1999), founder of the Hess Corporation (now led by his son, John B. Hess (1954–)) and former owner of NFL's New York Jets
 Ludwig Jesselson (1910–1993), German-born metal trader who served as president and CEO of Philipp Brothers
 Adolph (1849–1938) and Leonard Lewisohn (1847–1902), German-born mining magnates, founders of Lewisohn Bros.
 George Lindemann (1936–2018), chairman and CEO of the Southern Union Company
 Benedict I. Lubell (1909–1996), founder of the Lubell Oil Company
 Samuel Newhouse (1853–1930), mining magnate; developed Newhouse, Utah
 Andrew Perlman (1975–), co-founder of GreatPoint Energy
 Samuel Ruben (1900–1988), co-founder of Duracell Inc.
 Charles Schusterman (1935–2000), Russian-born founder of the Samson Investment Company

Financial services

Food

Manufacturing and distribution

Miscellaneous 

 Juval Aviv (1947–), Israeli-American founder of corporate investigations firm Interfor International
 Larry Baer, CEO of MLB's San Francisco Giants
 Henry (1922–2019) and Richard Bloch (1926–2004), founders of tax preparation company H&R Block, Inc.
 Al Davis (1929–2011), long-time owner of NFL's Oakland Raiders
 Heidi Fleiss (1965–), former madam, owner of the Nevada-based Flying S Ranch Ultralight Flightpark, an ultralight private use airport
 Orit Gadiesh (1951–), Israeli-American corporate strategist, chairwoman of global management consultancy Bain & Company
 Jonathan Greenstein (1967–), founder of auction house J. Greenstein & Company
 Ami James (1972–), Israeli-American entrepreneur, owner of the Miami-based Love Hate Tattoo Studio, and nightclub Love Hate Lounge
 Jules Kroll (1941–), founder of corporate investigation firm Kroll, Inc.
 Terry Lenzner (1939–2020), founder of Investigative Group International (IGI)
 Jason Levien, co-owner of D.C. United Holdings (holds MLS' D.C. United), co-owner of EFL Championship's Swansea City A.F.C. and NBL Australia's Brisbane Bullets, former CEO of NBA's Memphis Grizzlies
 Ira A. Lipman (1940–2019), founder and chairman of security company Guardsmark
 Moishe Mana (1956–), Israeli-born founder of Moishe's Moving Systems, GRM Information Management and MILK Studios
 Barry Minkow (1966–), founder of carpet-cleaning company ZZZZ Best Co.
 Morris Mirkin (1919–1985), founder of Budget Rent-a-Car
 Abraham Saperstein (1902–1966), British-born founder of the Harlem Globetrotters; former owner of NLB's Chicago Brown Bombers and the Birmingham Black Barons
 Louis Sloss (1823–1902), co-founder of the Alaska Commercial Company
 Casey Wasserman (1974–), founder of sports marketing and talent management company Wasserman
 Mark Weinberger (1964/1965–), former chairman of multinational professional services firm Ernst & Young (EY)
 Sheldon Yellen (1958–), CEO of BELFOR Property Restoration
 Daniel Yergin (1947–), vice chairman of research and information company, IHS Markit

Music industry

Newspapers and publishing

Pharmaceuticals and healthcare 

 Arie S. Belldegrun (1949–), Israeli-American (co-)founder of Kite Pharma and biotechnology companies Agensys, Allogene Therapeutics
 Howard Birndorf (1950–), co-founder of biotechnology companies Hybritech, Inc., Gen-Probe (merged with Hologic) and IDEC Pharmaceuticals (merged with Biogen)
 Phillip Frost (1936–), entrepreneur, chairman and CEO of OPKO Health, former Vice chairman of Teva
 Alex Grass (1927–2009), founder of the Rite Aid Corporation
 Bennett Greenspan (1952–), co-founder of gene testing company Gene by Gene, Ltd. (Family Tree DNA)
 Rachel Haurwitz (1985–), co-founder of gene editing company Caribou Biosciences
 Joel Landau, co-founder of nursing home operator company The Allure Group and healthcare services company AlphaCare
 Jeremy Levin (1954–), South African-born chairman of Ovid Therapeutics Inc., former CEO of Teva
 Arthur D. Levinson (1950–), CEO of biotechnology company Calico, former chairman of Genentech
 Al Mann (1925–2016), founder of biotechnology companies Pacesetter Systems and the MannKind Corporation
 Stewart Rahr (1946–), founder of Kinray Inc.
 Shlomo Rechnitz (1971–), health care magnate, co-founder of TwinMed LLC
 Richard Roberts (1957–), former owner of URL Pharma (acquired by the Takeda Pharmaceutical Company in 2012)
 Martine Rothblatt (1954–), founder of biotechnology company United Therapeutics, co-founder of Sirius Satellite Radio
 Mortimer (1916–2010) and Raymond Sackler (1920–2017), former owners of Purdue Pharma (known for OxyContin); members of the Sackler family
 Leonard Schleifer (1953–), founder of biotechnology company Regeneron Pharmaceuticals
 Cheryl Shuman, founder of the Beverly Hills Cannabis Club
 Daniel E. Straus (1956–), founder of CareOne LLC and minority owner of NBA's Memphis Grizzlies
 Samuel D. Waksal (1947–), French-born founder of ImClone Systems, Kadmon Corporation
 Herbert Wertheim (1939–), founder of eye care products manufacturing company Brain Power Incorporated (BPI)
 Ron Zwanziger (1954–), Israeli-American founder of diagnostic testing devices manufacturing company Alere, Inc.

Real estate

Retail

Technology and software 

 Rony Abovitz (1971–), founder of Magic Leap, co-founder of the MAKO Surgical Corp.
 Leonard Adleman (1945–), co-founder of RSA Security LLC
 Aron Ain, chairman of the Ultimate Kronos Group (UKG)
 Beny Alagem (1953–), Israeli-American co-founder of Packard Bell, owner of the Beverly Hilton hotel
 Kobi Alexander (1952–), Israeli-American co-founder of Comverse Technology
 Steve Ballmer (1956–), former long-time CEO of the Microsoft Corporation, founder of USAFacts and owner of NBA's Los Angeles Clippers
 Werner Michael Blumenthal (1926–), former chairman and CEO of Burroughs Corporation and Unisys
 Julian A. Brodsky (1933–), co-founder of the Comcast Corporation
 Safra Catz (1961–), Israeli-born CEO and co-president of the Oracle Corporation
 Alon Nisim Cohen (1968–), Israeli-born co-founder of CyberArk
 Bram Cohen (1975–), author of the BitTorrent protocol, co-founder of BitTorrent, Inc.
 Jared Cohen (1981–), CEO of technology incubator company Jigsaw (formerly Google Ideas)
 Michael Dell (1965–), founder of DELL
 Larry Ellison (1944–), co-founder of the Oracle Corporation
 David Frankel, South African-born tech investor, co-founder of Internet Solutions (IS), the largest ISP in Africa
 Gideon Gartner (1935–2020), Mandatory Palestine-born founder of Gartner, Inc.
 Levy Gerzberg (1945–), Israeli-American founder of the Zoran Corporation
 Rob Glaser (1962–), founder of RealNetworks, Inc. (RealPlayer), partner at Accel
 Andrew Grove (1936–2016), former COO, chairman and CEO (1st) of Intel
 Andi Gutmans, Swiss-American co-founder of Zend Technologies, co-creator of PHP, General Manager at Amazon Web Services (AWS)
 Eli Harari (1945–), Israeli-American co-founder of the SanDisk Corporation
 David (1944–) and Orion Hindawi (1980–), founders of cybersecurity firm Tanium Inc.
 Irwin M. (1933–) and Paul E. Jacobs (1962–), Qualcomm Incorporated
 Andy Jassy (1968–), CEO of Amazon, co-founder of Amazon Web Services (AWS), co-owner of NHL's Seattle Kraken
 Philippe Kahn (1952–), French-born creator of the camera phone, co-founder of the Borland Software Corporation
 Dan Kaminsky, co-founder of cybersecurity firm White Ops
 Mitch Kapor (1950–), founder of Lotus Software, co-founder of the Electronic Frontier Foundation (EFF)
 Phil Katz (1962–2000), founder of PKWARE, Inc., creator of the Zip file format; died of alcoholism in 2000 at age 37
 Steve Kirsch (1956–), founder of OneID, co-founder of the Frame Technology Corp. (now Adobe FrameMaker)
 Edwin H. Land (1909–1991), founder of the Polaroid Corporation
 Sandy Lerner (1955–), co-founder of Cisco Systems and cosmetics brand Urban Decay
 Daniel Lewin (1970–2001), American-Israeli co-founder of Akamai Technologies Inc.; 9/11 victim
 Joseph Lubin (1964–), Canadian-American founder of blockchain software technology company ConsenSys, co-founder of Ethereum
 Ken Oshman (1940–2011), former CEO of the Echelon Corporation, co-founder of the ROLM Corporation
 Brian L. (1959–) and Ralph J. Roberts (1920–2015), the Comcast Corporation; members of the Roberts family
 Lior Ron (1977–), Israeli-American co-founder of self-driving truck company Otto, former Product Lead for Google Maps
 Ben Rosen (1933–), founding investor and former chairman of the Compaq Computer Corporation, co-founder of venture capital firm Sevin Rosen Funds
 Andy Rubin (1963–), co-developer of the Android operating system, co-founder of Android, Inc., Danger Inc. and Playground Global
 Michael G. Rubin (1972–), founder of eBay Enterprise, Inc. (formerly GSI Commerce, Inc.)
 Henry Samueli (1954–), co-founder of the Broadcom Corporation, owner of NHL's Anaheim Ducks (founded in 1993 by Disney as "the Mighty Ducks of Anaheim")
 Steve Sarowitz (1965/1966–), founder of the Paylocity Corporation
 Dan Schulman (1958–), president and CEO of PayPal, and chairman of the Symantec Corporation, former CEO of Virgin Mobile
 Ivan Seidenberg (1946–), former chairman and CEO of Verizon Communications, partner at Perella Weinberg Partners
 Charlie Shrem (1989–), co-founder of BitInstant (defunct) and Intellisys Capital, former Vice chairman of the Bitcoin Foundation
 Joel Spolsky (1965–), co-founder of the Stack Exchange Network, founder of Fog Creek Software, creator of Trello
 Kirill Tatarinov, Russian-born former CEO of Citrix Systems, Inc., former executive VP of Microsoft Business Solutions
 Jack Tramiel (1928–2012), Polish-born founder of Commodore International and the Atari Corporation (bought from Warner Communications in 1984)
 Alan Trefler (1956–), founder of Pegasystems
 Kenneth D. Tuchman (1959–), founder of TeleTech
 Andrew Viterbi (1935–), co-founder of Qualcomm Incorporated, inventor of the Viterbi algorithm
 Gary Winnick (1947–), founder of telecommunications company Global Crossing
 Stephen Wolfram (1959–), British-American founder of Wolfram Research
 Amit Yoran, former president of RSA Security LLC, former CEO of network security company Netwitness, co-founder of Riptech
 Charles Zegar (1948–), co-founder of Innovative Market Systems (later renamed Bloomberg L.P.)
 John Zimmer (1984–), co-founder of on-demand transportation company Lyft
 Nir Zuk (1971–), Israeli-American co-founder of cybersecurity company Palo Alto Networks

New media 

 Robert A. Altman (1947–2021), co-founder of ZeniMax Media (owns id Software, Arkane Studios, Bethesda Softworks)
 Sam Altman (1985–), former president of Y Combinator and co-founder of OpenAI
 Amir Ashkenazi, Israeli-American co-founder of Adap.tv and Shopping.com
 Scott Belsky (1980–), founder of Behance
 Marc Benioff (1964–), co-founder of cloud computing company Salesforce
 Sergey Brin (1973–), Russian-born co-founder of Google, Inc., president of Alphabet Inc., director at X
 Jay Cohen (1968–), online gambling pioneer, co-founder of WSEX
 Dan Doctoroff (1958–), chairman of urban innovation organization Sidewalk Labs and smart cities tech company Intersection, former president of Bloomberg L.P.
 Greg Fischbach (1942–), co-founder of Acclaim Entertainment
 Mark Ghermezian, Canadian-American co-founder of mobile marketing company Braze, Inc.
 Craig Taro Gold (1969–), co-founder of eVoice and Teleo
 Justin Hartfield, founder of the Ghost Group and Weedmaps
 Gary Kaplan (1959–), founder of the online sports betting company, BetonSports.com
 Jonathan Klein (1960–), South African-born co-founder of Getty Images
 Josh Kopelman (1972–), founder of Half.com, First Round Capital, chairman of Philadelphia Media Network, LLC
 Jan Koum (1976–), Ukrainian-American co-founder of WhatsApp, Inc.
 Jon Kraft, co-founder of Pandora Media, Inc. and Thrively
 Gary Kremen (1963–), founder of Match.com; first registrant of Sex.com (Kremen v. Cohen)
 Eric Lefkofsky (1969–), co-founder of Groupon
 Max Levchin (1975–), Ukrainian-born co-founder of PayPal and financial technology company Affirm; member of the "PayPal Mafia"
 Aaron Levie (1985–), CEO and co-founder of Box Inc.
 Joey Levin, CEO of media and Internet company IAC/InterActiveCorp (holds Vimeo LLC, Match Group, Inc., Tinder, Ask.com)
 David Litman (1957–), co-founder of Hotels.com
 Talmon Marco, Israeli-American co-founder of Viber, founder of Juno
 Andrew Mason (1981–), co-founder of Groupon
 Yuri Milner (1961–), Russian-born Israeli-American tech investor, co-founder of DST Global, former chairman and CEO of Mail.Ru (owns VKontakte)
 Michael Morhaime (1967–), co-founder of Blizzard Entertainment
 Adam (1979–) and Rebekah Neumann (1978–), co-founders of WeWork
 Craig Newmark (1952–), founder of Craigslist
 Shaul Olmert (1975–), Israeli-American co-founder of online publishing platform EX.CO (formerly Playbuzz), former VP of digital products for MTV Networks
 Jon Oringer (1974–), founder of Shutterstock
 Larry Page (1973–), co-founder of Google, Inc., CEO of Alphabet Inc.
 Andrew Paulson (1958–2017), co-founder of SUP Media (LiveJournal)
 Mark Pincus (1966–), co-founder of social game developing company Zynga
 Ruth Porat (1957–), British-American CFO of Alphabet Inc.
 Jeff Pulver (1962–), VoIP pioneer, co-founder of Vonage
 Sean Rad (1986–), co-founder of Tinder
 Bob Rosenschein (1953–), American-Israeli founder of Curiyo, co-founder of Answers.com
 David O. Sacks (1972–), South African-born co-founder of Yammer, CEO of Zenefits, founding COO of PayPal
 Sheryl Sandberg (1969–), COO of Facebook, Inc., former VP of global online sales and operations at Google
 Terry Semel (1943–), former chairman and CEO of both Yahoo! and Warner Bros.
 Jeremy Stoppelman (1977–), co-founder of Yelp
 Aaron Swartz (1986–2013), co-creator of RSS (web feed) and Reddit
 Jeff Weiner (1970–), CEO of LinkedIn
 Devin Wenig (1966–), former president and CEO of eBay Inc.
 Rus Yusupov (1984–), Tajik SSR-born co-founder of video hosting service Vine, and HQ Trivia
 Mark Zuckerberg (1984–), co-founder of Facebook, Inc.

Television, film and video

Tourism and hotels 

 Sheldon Adelson (1933–2021), casino magnate, founder of the Las Vegas Sands Corporation (owns the Venetian, the Palazzo, Marina Bay Sands), co-founder of the Interface Group (COMDEX)
 Micky Arison (1949–), Israeli-American chairman of Carnival Corporation & plc, the world's largest travel leisure company and owner of NBA's Miami Heat; member of the Arison family
 Severyn Ashkenazy (1936–), Polish-born hotelier, former co-owner of the Viceroy L'Ermitage Beverly Hills
 Mel Bernstein (1945–), Colorado-based paintball park and military museum owner
 Paul Binder (1942–), co-founder of the Big Apple Circus
 Ernie Blake (1913–1989), German-born founder of Toas Ski Valley
 Alan Faena (1963–), Argentine-American Miami Beach-based hotelier, owner of the Faena Hotel Buenos Aires
 Gene Freidman, Russian-born founder of Taxi Club Management (TCM)
 Rande Gerber (1962–), nightlife industry entrepreneur, founder of the Gerber Group, co-founder of tequila label Casamigos
 Dan Gilbert (1962–), founder of Detroit-based Jack Entertainment LLC and co-owner of NBA's Cleveland Cavaliers
 Joe Gold (1922–2004), founder of Gold's Gym International, Inc. and World Gym International
 Bernie Goldstein (1929–2009), founder of Isle of Capri Casinos, Inc.
 David Grutman (1974–), Miami-based nightlife mogul, co-founder of the Miami Marketing Group (MMG)
 Efrem Harkham, Israeli-born Beverly Hills-based hotelier, owner of the Luxe Rodeo Drive Hotel
 Jeremy Jacobs (1940–), chairman of hospitality company Delaware North, owner of NHL's Boston Bruins
 Alfred Kaskel (1901–1968), Polish-born founder of Doral Hotels and Resorts (Doral Beach Hotel) and Carol Management (Doral Country Club)
 Jake Kozloff (1901–1976), Russian-born casino manager, former owner of the Frontier hotel & casino
 Bill Miller (1904–2002), Russian-born former night club and casino operator
 Sam Nazarian (1975–), Iranian-American founder of SBE Entertainment Group (Mondrian Hotels, Delano South Beach, Delano Las Vegas); member of the Nazarian family
 Ben Novack (1907–1985), former developer and owner of the Fontainebleau Miami Beach
 Eli Ostreicher (1984–), British-American founder of Regal Wings, a B2B luxury air service provider; brother of investor Jacob Ostreicher
 Alberto Perlman (1977–), Colombian-American co-founder of Zumba Fitness, LLC
 Jason Pomeranc, hotelier, co-founder of the SIXTY Collective and the Thompson Hotels Group
 Jay Pritzker (1922–1999), co-founder of the Hyatt Hotels Corporation (now led by his son, Thomas Pritzker (1950–)); member of the Pritzker family
 Eugene Remm, Russian-born co-founder of the EMM Group (now Catch Hospitality Group)
 Harris Rosen (1939–), Florida-based founder of Rosen Hotels & Resorts
 Ed Savitz (1942–1993), former Philadelphia-based amusement arcade owner
 Izak Senbahar, Turkish-born hotelier, co-founder of the Alexico Group
 Bugsy Siegel (1906–1947), co-founder of the Flamingo casino and Murder, Inc., former co-owner of the El Cortez Hotel and Casino
 David A. Siegel (1935–), founder of Westgate Resorts
 Gordon Sondland (1957–), founder of Provenance Hotels
 Noah Tepperberg (1975–), NYC-based co-founder of Strategic Hospitality Group (owns Tao, Lavo, Marquee New York)
 Jonathan Tisch (1953–), chairman of Loews Hotels, co-chairman of family-owned Loews Corporation and co-owner of NFL's New York Giants; member of the Tisch family
 Sid Wyman (1910–1978), co-owner of Las Vegas casinos Sands, Riviera, Royal Nevada, and The Dunes.
 Steve Wynn (1942–), Las Vegas casino owner, founder of Wynn Resorts

Restaurants 

 Burt Baskin (1913–1967), co-founder of ice cream and cake restaurants chain Baskin-Robbins
 George Cohon (1937–), American-born Canadian founder of McDonald's of Canada and Russia
 Nathan Handwerker (1892–1974), Polish-born co-founder of Nathan's Famous, Inc. (later led by his son, Murray (1921–2011))
 Reuben and Rose Mattus (1912–1994; 1916–2006), founders of Häagen-Dazs (ice cream)
 Rich Melman (1942–), co-founder of Lettuce Entertain You Enterprises (LEYE) restaurants
 Danny Meyer (1958–), founder of the Union Square Hospitality Group (owns Shake Shack Inc., Gramercy Tavern)
 Arnie Morton (1922–2005), co-founder of Morton's The Steakhouse
 Clifford S. Perlman (1926–2016), co-founder of Lum's restaurant chain and former owner of Las Vegas' Caesars Palace luxury hotel
 William Rosenberg (1916–2002), founder of Dunkin' Donuts
 Howard Schultz (1953–), former executive chairman of Starbucks and owner of NBA's Seattle SuperSonics; co-founder of venture capital fund Maveron
 Daniel Schwartz (1980/1981–), co-chairman of Restaurant Brands International Inc. (RBI), the parent company of Burger King, Tim Hortons and Popeyes
 Zev Siegl (1942–), co-founder of the Starbucks Corporation

See also 
 Lists of Jewish Americans
 Businesspeople
 in finance
 in media
 in real estate
 in retail

References

Further reading 
 
 
 
 
 
 
 
 
 
 
 
 
 
 
 

Businesspeople
Jewish Americans
Jews
Jews